The 2002–03 NBA season was the Lakers' 55th season in the National Basketball Association, and 43rd in the city of Los Angeles. The Lakers entered the season as the three-time defending champions, having defeated the New Jersey Nets in four straight games in the 2002 NBA Finals, winning their fourteenth NBA championship. With All-Star center Shaquille O'Neal sidelined early in the season after an off-season right foot and toe surgery, the Lakers got off to a terrible 3–9 start. After he returned, the team only improved slowly, having an 11–19 record 30 games into the season, their worst start in ten years. However, the Lakers would recover from their slow start, and hold a 24–23 record at the All-Star break, ninth place in the Western Conference at the time, and out of playoff position. The Lakers won 11 of their final 13 games ending the season with a 50–32 record, finishing fifth in the Western Conference.

The season saw co-captain Kobe Bryant play all 82 games for the first time in his career, as he averaged 30.0 points, 6.9 rebounds, 5.9 assists and 2.2 steals per game, while O'Neal averaged 27.5 points, 11.1 rebounds and 2.4 blocks per game. In addition, Derek Fisher provided the team with 10.5 points and 3.6 assists per game, while Rick Fox contributed 9.0 points per game, and Robert Horry provided with 6.5 points and 6.4 rebounds per game. Kobe and Shaq were both named to the All-NBA First Team, and were both selected to play in the 2003 NBA All-Star Game in Atlanta. Kobe was named to the NBA All-Defensive First Team, and finished in third place in MVP voting with 8 first-place votes, while Shaq was named to the NBA All-Defensive Second Team, and finished in fifth place in MVP voting with 3 first-place votes.

Facing an uphill battle without home-court advantage, the Lakers managed to beat the 4th-seeded Minnesota Timberwolves in the Western Conference First Round of the playoffs, but fell to the top-seeded and eventual champion San Antonio Spurs in six games in the Western Conference Semi-finals. The Spurs would reach the Finals to defeat the New Jersey Nets in six games, winning their second championship. Following the season, Horry signed as a free agent with the San Antonio Spurs, while Mark Madsen signed with the Minnesota Timberwolves, Samaki Walker signed with the Miami Heat, and Brian Shaw retired.

The season was overshadowed by the death of long-time Lakers broadcaster Chick Hearn, who died after a fall in the summer of 2002. To pay tribute, the Lakers donned an alternate white uniform, which can be only worn on Christmas and Sunday home games. The uniforms made its debut in a home loss against the Sacramento Kings on Christmas Day. They were designed by late owner Jerry Buss' daughter, who is now the controlling owner and president of the Los Angeles Lakers, Jeanie.

Draft picks

Roster

Regular season

Season standings

z - clinched division title
y - clinched division title
x - clinched playoff spot

Record vs. opponents

Game log

Regular season

|- style="background:#fcc;"
| 1
| October 29
| San Antonio
| L 82-87
| Kobe Bryant (27)
| Bryant & Walker (10)
| Kobe Bryant (5)
| Staples Center18,997
| 0-1
|- style="background:#fcc;"
| 2
| October 30
| @ Portland
| L 90–102
| Kobe Bryant (25)
| Kobe Bryant (10)
| Devean George (5)
| Rose Garden20,225
| 0-2

|- style="background:#cfc;"
| 3
| November 1
| @ L.A. Clippers
| W 108-93
| Kobe Bryant (33)
| Kobe Bryant (15)
| Kobe Bryant (12)
| Staples Center20,474
| 1–2
|- style="background:#cfc;"
| 4
| November 3
| Portland
| W 98-95 (OT)
| Kobe Bryant (33)
| Kobe Bryant (14)
| Kobe Bryant (12)
| Staples Center18,997
| 2-2
|- style="background:#fcc;"
| 5
| November 5
| @ Cleveland
| L 70-89
| Kobe Bryant (15)
| Kobe Bryant (13)
| Kobe Bryant (9)
| Gund Arena19,833
| 2–3
|- style="background:#fcc;"
| 6
| November 7
| @ Boston
| L 95-98 (OT)
| Kobe Bryant (41)
| Samaki Walker (12)
| Robert Horry (5)
| Fleet Center18,624
| 2-4
|- style="background:#fcc;"
| 7
| November 8
| @ Washington
| L 99–100
| Kobe Bryant (27)
| Rick Fox (8)
| Robert Horry (5)
| MCI Center20,173
| 2–5
|- style="background:#fcc;"
| 8
| November 12
| Atlanta
| L 83–95
| Kobe Bryant (21)
| Samaki Walker (10)
| Kobe Bryant (8)
| Staples Center18,997
| 2-6
|- style="background:#cfc;"
| 9
| November 15
| Golden State
| W 96-89 (OT)
| Kobe Bryant (45)
| Fox & Walker (14)
| Brian Shaw (8)
| Staples Center18,997
| 3-6
|- style="background:#fcc;"
| 10
| November 17
| Houston
| L 89–93
| Kobe Bryant (46)
| Horry & Walker (9)
| Kobe Bryant (4)
| Staples Center18,997
| 3–7
|- style="background:#fcc;"
| 11
| November 19
| @ Dallas
| L 72-98
| Kobe Bryant (16)
| Fox & Walker (9)
| Kobe Bryant (5)
| American Airlines Center20,096
| 3–8
|- style="background:#fcc;"
| 12
| November 20
| @ San Antonio
| L 88-95
| Kobe Bryant (24)
| Samaki Walker (10)
| Kobe Bryant (7)
| SBC Center18,797
| 3–9
|- style="background:#cfc;"
| 13
| November 22
| Chicago
| W 86–73
| Kobe Bryant (21)
| Kobe Bryant (10)
| Kobe Bryant (7)
| Staples Center18,997
| 4–9
|- style="background:#cfc;"
| 14
| November 24
| Milwaukee
| W 111–99
| Shaquille O'Neal (24)
| Bryant & O'Neal (11)
| Kobe Bryant (11)
| Staples Center18,997
| 5–9
|- style="background:#fcc;"
| 15
| November 26
| @ Miami
| L 85-97
| Kobe Bryant (21)
| Robert Horry (9)
| Kobe Bryant (4)
| American Airlines Arena16,500
| 5-10
|- style="background:#fcc;"
| 16
| November 27
| @ Orlando
| L 102–112
| Kobe Bryant (38)
| Bryant & Fox (10)
| Fox & Horry (6)
| TD Waterhouse Centre17,283
| 5–11
|- style="background:#cfc;"
| 17
| November 29
| @ Memphis
| W 112-106 (OT)
| Kobe Bryant (45)
| Shaquille O'Neal (13)
| Rick Fox (6)
| Pyramid Arena19,351
| 6–11

|- style="background:#fcc;"
| 18
| December 1
| Minnesota
| L 107-110
| Shaquille O'Neal (31)
| Shaquille O'Neal (13)
| Kobe Bryant (11)
| Staples Center18,997
| 6-12
|- style="background:#cfc;"
| 19
| December 3
| Memphis
| W 101-91
| Shaquille O'Neal (28)
| Kobe Bryant (10)
| Kobe Bryant (11)
| Staples Center18,512
| 7-12
|- style="background:#fcc;"
| 20
| December 4
| @ Utah
| L 85-93
| Shaquille O'Neal (23)
| Shaquille O'Neal (15)
| Kobe Bryant (5)
| Delta Center19,657
| 7-13
|- style="background:#cfc;"
| 21
| December 6
| Dallas
| W 105-103
| Kobe Bryant (27)
| Shaquille O'Neal (11)
| Kobe Bryant (7)
| Staples Center18,997
| 8-13
|- style="background:#cfc;"
| 22
| December 8
| Utah
| W 110-101
| Shaquille O'Neal (32)
| Shaquille O'Neal (11)
| Kobe Bryant (14)
| Staples Center18,997
| 9-13
|- style="background:#fcc;"
| 23
| December 10
| @ Golden State
| L 102-106
| Shaquille O'Neal (36)
| Robert Horry (12)
| Kobe Bryant (14)
| The Arena in Oakland19,596
| 9-14
|- style="background:#fcc;"
| 24
| December 13
| New Orleans
| L 82-98
| Shaquille O'Neal (28)
| Shaquille O'Neal (10)
| Derek Fisher (6)
| Staples Center18,997
| 9-15
|- style="background:#cfc;"
| 25
| December 15
| Orlando
| W 107-84
| Shaquille O'Neal (30)
| Shaquille O'Neal (14)
| Kobe Bryant (8)
| Staples Center18,997
| 10-15
|- style="background:#fcc;"
| 26
| December 17
| @ Minnesota
| L 80-96
| Shaquille O'Neal (17)
| Shaquille O'Neal (9)
| Kobe Bryant (6)
| Target Center16,447
| 10-16
|- style="background:#fcc;"
| 27
| December 19
| @ New Jersey
| L 71-98
| Kobe Bryant (21)
| Robert Horry (11)
| Kobe Bryant (5)
| Continental Airlines Arena20,049
| 10-17
|- style="background:#fcc;"
| 28
| December 20
| @ Philadelphia
| L 104-107 (OT)
| Kobe Bryant (44)
| Shaquille O'Neal (14)
| Kobe Bryant (10)
| First Union Center21,127
| 10-18
|- style="background:#cfc;"
| 29
| December 22
| @ Toronto
| W 109-107 (OT)
| Bryant & O'Neal (31)
| Shaquille O'Neal (15)
| Derek Fisher (7)
| Air Canada Centre19,800
| 11-18
|- style="background:#fcc;"
| 30
| December 25
| Sacramento
| L 99-105
| Bryant & O'Neal (27)
| Shaquille O'Neal (17)
| Kobe Bryant (6)
| Staples Center18,997
| 11-19
|- style="background:#cfc;"
| 31
| December 28
| @ Denver
| W 112-93
| Kobe Bryant (39)
| Shaquille O'Neal (13)
| Derek Fisher (9)
| Pepsi Center19,099
| 12-19
|- style="background:#cfc;"
| 32
| December 29
| Toronto
| W 104-88
| Shaquille O'Neal (35)
| Shaquille O'Neal (10)
| Kobe Bryant (12)
| Staples Center18,997
| 13-19

|- style="background:#fcc;"
| 33
| January 4
| @ Phoenix
| L 93-107
| Kobe Bryant (37)
| Shaquille O'Neal (9)
| Kobe Bryant (7)
| American West Arena19,023
| 13-20
|- style="background:#cfc;"
| 34
| January 5
| Phoenix
| W 109-97
| Shaquille O'Neal (36)
| Shaquille O'Neal (16)
| Rick Fox (8)
| Staples Center18,642
| 14-20
|- style="background:#cfc;"
| 35
| January 7
| Seattle
| W 119-98
| Kobe Bryant (45)
| Robert Horry (8)
| Shaquille O'Neal (7)
| Staples Center18,997
| 15-20
|- style="background:#cfc;"
| 36
| January 10
| Cleveland
| W 115-99
| Shaquille O'Neal (26)
| Kobe Bryant (10)
| Kobe Bryant (11)
| Staples Center18,997
| 16-20
|- style="background:#cfc;"
| 37
| January 12
| Miami
| W 106-81
| Kobe Bryant (36)
| Samaki Walker (16)
| Shaquille O'Neal (5)
| Staples Center18,997
| 17-20
|- style="background:#cfc;"
| 38
| January 15
| @ New Orleans
| W 90-82
| Kobe Bryant (36)
| Bryant & O'Neal (11)
| Kobe Bryant (4)
| New Orleans Arena18,509
| 18-20
|- style="background:#fcc;"
| 39
| January 17
| @ Houston
| L 104-108 (OT)
| Shaquille O'Neal (31)
| Shaquille O'Neal (13)
| Kobe Bryant (9)
| Compaq Center16,285
| 18-21
|- style="background:#cfc;"
| 40
| January 20
| L.A. Clippers
| W 96-92
| Shaquille O'Neal (32)
| O'Neal & Walker (15)
| Kobe Bryant (11)
| Staples Center18,997
| 19-21
|- style="background:#fcc;"
| 41
| January 22
| Golden State
| L 110-114
| Shaquille O'Neal (28)
| Shaquille O'Neal (9)
| Kobe Bryant (7)
| Staples Center18,997
| 19-22
|- style="background:#fcc;"
| 42
| January 24
| New Jersey
| L 83-89
| Shaquille O'Neal (27)
| Shaquille O'Neal (13)
| Bryant & Fisher (5)
| Staples Center18,997
| 19-23
|- style="background:#cfc;"
| 43
| January 29
| @ Phoenix
| W 99-90
| Kobe Bryant (40)
| Shaquille O'Neal (12)
| Shaquille O'Neal (6)
| American West Arena18,437
| 20-23
|- style="background:#cfc;"
| 44
| January 31
| @ Sacramento
| W 124-113
| Kobe Bryant (38)
| Shaquille O'Neal (10)
| Shaquille O'Neal (6)
| ARCO Arena17,317
| 21-23

|- style="background:#cfc;"
| 45
| February 1
| Utah
| W 99-87
| Kobe Bryant (42)
| Shaquille O'Neal (13)
| Robert Horry (6)
| Staples Center18,997
|  22-23
|- style="background:#cfc;"
| 46
| February 4
| @ Indiana
| W 97-94
| Kobe Bryant (35)
| Shaquille O'Neal (12)
| Fisher & Fox (5)
| Conseco Fieldhouse18,345
| 23-23
|- style="background:#cfc;"
| 47
| February 6
| @ New York
| W 114-109
| Kobe Bryant (46)
| Robert Horry (12)
| Shaquille O'Neal (7)
| Madison Square Garden19,763
| 24-23
|- align="center"
|colspan="9" bgcolor="#bbcaff"|All-Star Break
|- style="background:#cfc;"
|- bgcolor="#bbffbb"
|- style="background:#cfc;"
| 48
| February 11
| Denver
| W 121-93
| Kobe Bryant (42)
| Kareem Rush (9)
| 4 players tied (5)
| Staples Center18,848
| 25-23
|- style="background:#cfc;"
| 49
| February 12
| @ Denver
| W 113-102
| Kobe Bryant (51)
| Samaki Walker (14)
| Bryant & Fox (4)
| Pepsi Center17,757
| 26-23
|- style="background:#fcc;"
| 50
| February 14
| San Antonio
| L 95-103
| Kobe Bryant (44)
| Robert Horry (15)
| Robert Horry (6)
| Staples Center18,997
| 26-24
|- style="background:#fcc;"
| 51
| February 16
| New York
| L 110-117
| Kobe Bryant (40)
| Robert Horry (11)
| Derek Fisher (8)
| Staples Center18,997
| 26-25
|- style="background:#cfc;"
| 52
| February 18
| Houston
| W 106-99 (2OT)
| Kobe Bryant (52)
| Robert Horry (11)
| Kobe Bryant (7)
| Staples Center18,997
| 27-25
|- style="background:#cfc;"
| 53
| February 19
| @ Utah
| W 93-87
| Kobe Bryant 
| Bryant & George (6)
| Derek Fisher (4)
| Delta Center19,911
| 28-25
|- style="background:#cfc;"
| 54
| February 21
| Portland
| W 92-84
| Kobe Bryant (40)
| Shaquille O'Neal (12)
| Robert Horry (5)
| Staples Center18,997
| 29-25
|- style="background:#cfc;"
| 55
| February 23
| Seattle
| W 106-101
| Kobe Bryant (41)
| Shaquille O'Neal (17)
| Kareem Rush (7)
| Staples Center18,997
| 30-25
|- style="background:#cfc;"
| 56
| February 25
| L.A. Clippers
| W 109-98
| Shaquille O'Neal (33)
| Robert Horry (10)
| Rick Fox (8)
| Staples Center18,997
| 31-25
|- style="background:#cfc;"
| 57
| February 27
| Detroit
| W 95-85
| Shaquille O'Neal (35)
| Shaquille O'Neal (14)
| Rick Fox (6)
| Staples Center18,997
| 32-25
|- style="background:#fcc;"
| 58
| February 28
| @ Seattle
| L 90-107
| Kobe Bryant (34)
| Shaquille O'Neal (11)
| Kobe Bryant (9)
| KeyArena17,072
| 32-26

|- style="background:#cfc;"
| 59
| March 5
| Indiana
| W 97-95
| Shaquille O'Neal (26)
| Shaquille O'Neal (11)
| Robert Horry (6)
| Staples Center18,997
| 33-26
|- style="background:#cfc;"
| 60
| March 7
| Minnesota
| W 106-96
| Shaquille O'Neal (40)
| Shaquille O'Neal (14)
| Kobe Bryant (7)
| Staples Center18,997
| 34-26
|- style="background:#cfc;"
| 61
| March 9
| Philadelphia
| W 106-92
| Shaquille O'Neal (39)
| Shaquille O'Neal (10)
| Kobe Bryant (9)
| Staples Center18,997
| 35-26
|- style="background:#fcc;"
| 62
| March 11
| @ Chicago
| L 99-116
| Kobe Bryant (36)
| Shaquille O'Neal (10)
| Bryant & Fisher (5)
| United Center23,122
| 35-27
|- style="background:#fcc;"
| 63
| March 12
| @ Detroit
| L 88-111
| Shaquille O'Neal (24)
| Shaquille O'Neal (13)
| Derek Fisher (5)
| The Palace of Auburn Hills22,076
| 35-28
|- style="background:#cfc;"
| 64
| March 14
| @ Minnesota
| W 106-99
| Kobe Bryant (30)
| Shaquille O'Neal (15)
| Shaquille O'Neal (6)
| Target Center20,199
| 36-28
|- style="background:#cfc;"
| 65
| March 15
| @ Milwaukee
| W 98-94
| Shaquille O'Neal (24)
| Shaquille O'Neal (11)
| 3 players tied (5)
| Bradley Center18,717
| 37-28
|- style="background:#cfc;"
| 66
| March 17
| @ L.A. Clippers
| W 102-85
| Shaquille O'Neal (42)
| Bryant & O'Neal (7)
| Kobe Bryant (6)
| Staples Center20,101
| 38-28
|- style="background:#fcc;"
| 67
| March 20
| @ Sacramento
| L 99-107
| Kobe Bryant (34)
| Bryant & O'Neal (13)
| Robert Horry (5)
| ARCO Arena17,317
| 38-29
|- style="background:#cfc;"
| 68
| March 21
| Boston
| W 104-96
| Shaquille O'Neal (48)
| Shaquille O'Neal (20)
| Kobe Bryant (7)
| Staples Center18,997
| 39-29
|- style="background:#fcc;"
| 69
| March 23
| @ San Antonio
| L 89-98
| Shaquille O'Neal (32)
| Shaquille O'Neal (12)
| Derek Fisher (3)
| SBC Center18,797
| 39-30
|- style="background:#cfc;"
| 70
| March 25
| @ Atlanta
| W 108-91
| Shaquille O'Neal (31)
| Kobe Bryant (10)
| Bryant & Fisher (6)
| Philips Arena19,870
| 40-30
|- style="background:#cfc;"
| 71
| March 26
| @ Houston
| W 96-93
| Shaquille O'Neal (39)
| Kobe Bryant (9)
| Kobe Bryant (5)
| Compaq Center16,285
| 41-30
|- style="background:#cfc;"
| 72
| March 28
| Washington
| W 108-94
| Kobe Bryant (55)
| Shaquille O'Neal (13)
| Derek Fisher (7)
| Staples Center18,997
| 42-30
|- style="background:#fcc;"
| 73
| March 30
| @ Seattle
| L 98-119
| Shaquille O'Neal (34)
| Robert Horry (8)
| Rick Fox (6)
| KeyArena17,072
| 42-31
|- style="background:#cfc;"
| 74
| March 31
| Memphis
| W 110-94
| Shaquille O'Neal (34)
| Shaquille O'Neal (11)
| Kobe Bryant (8)
| Staples Center18,997
| 43-31

|- style="background:#cfc;"
| 75
| April 3
| @ Dallas
| W 100-89
| Shaquille O'Neal (31)
| Shaquille O'Neal (17)
| Kobe Bryant (6)
| American Airlines Center20,129
| 44-31
|- style="background:#cfc;"
| 76
| April 4
| @ Memphis
| W 102-101
| Shaquille O'Neal (33)
| Shaquille O'Neal (19)
| Kobe Bryant (6)
| Pyramid Arena19,351
| 45-31
|- style="background:#cfc;"
| 77
| April 6
| Phoenix
| W 115-113 (OT)
| Kobe Bryant (26)
| Shaquille O'Neal (13)
| Bryant & O'Neal (7)
| Staples Center18,997
| 46-31
|- style="background:#cfc;"
| 78
| April 8
| Dallas
| W 108-99
| Devean George (21)
| Horry & O'Neal (10)
| Derek Fisher (8)
| Staples Center18,997
| 47-31
|- style="background:#cfc;"
| 79
| April 10
| Sacramento
| W 117-104
| Kobe Bryant (34)
| Shaquille O'Neal (16)
| Derek Fisher (8)
| Staples Center18,997
| 48-31
|- style="background:#fcc;"
| 80
| April 13
| @ Portland
| L 99-101
| Bryant & O'Neal (36)
| Shaquille O'Neal (11)
| Kobe Bryant (7)
| Rose Garden20,580
| 48-32
|- style="background:#cfc;"
| 81
| April 15
| Denver
| W 126-104
| Kobe Bryant (32)
| Kobe Bryant (8)
| Jannero Pargo (5)
| Staples Center18,997
| 49-32
|- style="background:#cfc;"
| 82
| April 16
| @ Golden State
| W 117-111
| Kobe Bryant (44)
| Shaquille O'Neal (12)
| Robert Horry (6)
| The Arena in Oakland20,234
| 50-32

Playoffs

|- align="center" bgcolor="#ccffcc"
| 1
| April 20
| @ Minnesota
| W 117–98
| Kobe Bryant (39)
| Shaquille O'Neal (10)
| Bryant & Horry (8)
| Target Center17,097
| 1–0
|- align="center" bgcolor="#ffcccc"
| 2
| April 22
| @ Minnesota
| L 91–119
| Bryant & O'Neal (27)
| Shaquille O'Neal (14)
| Kobe Bryant (8)
| Target Center17,132
| 1–1
|- align="center" bgcolor="#ffcccc"
| 3
| April 24
| Minnesota
| L 110–114 (OT)
| Kobe Bryant (30)
| Shaquille O'Neal (17)
| Kobe Bryant (6)
| Staples Center18,997
| 1–2
|- align="center" bgcolor="#ccffcc"
| 4
| April 27
| Minnesota
| W 102–97
| Shaquille O'Neal (34)
| Shaquille O'Neal (23)
| Shaquille O'Neal (6)
| Staples Center18,997
| 2–2
|- align="center" bgcolor="#ccffcc"
| 5
| April 29
| @ Minnesota
| W 120–90
| Kobe Bryant (32)
| Shaquille O'Neal (11)
| Devean George (6)
| Target Center20,098
| 3–2
|- align="center" bgcolor="#ccffcc"
| 6
| May 1
| Minnesota
| W 101–85
| Kobe Bryant (31)
| Shaquille O'Neal (17)
| Shaquille O'Neal (9)
| Staples Center18,997
| 4–2
|-

|- align="center" bgcolor="#ffcccc"
| 1
| May 5
| @ San Antonio
| L 82–87
| Kobe Bryant (37)
| Shaquille O'Neal (21)
| Shaquille O'Neal (3)
| SBC Center18,797
| 0–1
|- align="center" bgcolor="#ffcccc"
| 2
| May 7
| @ San Antonio
| L 95–114
| Bryant & O'Neal (27)
| Shaquille O'Neal (10)
| Jannero Pargo (3)
| SBC Center18,797
| 0–2
|- align="center" bgcolor="#ccffcc"
| 3
| May 9
| San Antonio
| W 110–95
| Kobe Bryant (39)
| Shaquille O'Neal (16)
| Shaquille O'Neal (8)
| Staples Center18,997
| 1–2
|- align="center" bgcolor="#ccffcc"
| 4
| May 11
| San Antonio
| W 99–95
| Kobe Bryant (35)
| Shaquille O'Neal (17)
| Shaquille O'Neal (5)
| Staples Center18,997
| 2–2
|- align="center" bgcolor="#ffcccc"
| 5
| May 13
| @ San Antonio
| L 94–96
| Kobe Bryant (36)
| Shaquille O'Neal (12)
| Kobe Bryant (6)
| SBC Center18,797
| 2–3
|- align="center" bgcolor="#ffcccc"
| 6
| May 15
| San Antonio
| L 82–110
| Shaquille O'Neal (31)
| Shaquille O'Neal (10)
| Kobe Bryant (6)
| Staples Center18,997
| 2–4
|-

Player statistics

Regular season

Playoffs

Awards and records
 Shaquille O'Neal, All-NBA First Team
 Kobe Bryant, All-NBA First Team
 Kobe Bryant, NBA All-Defensive First Team
 Shaquille O'Neal, NBA All-Defensive Second Team

Transactions

References

Los Angeles Lakers seasons
Los Angle
Los Angle
Los Angle